John Bastow (30 October 1850 – 1 June 1927) was an English cricketer. He played five first-class matches for Middlesex between 1874 and 1877.

See also
 List of Middlesex County Cricket Club players

References

External links
 

1850 births
1927 deaths
English cricketers
Middlesex cricketers
People from Bromley-by-Bow
Cricketers from Greater London